Dahimi-ye Yek (also Romanized as Daḩīmī-ye Yek; also known as Dahīmeh-e Yek) is a village in Ahudasht Rural District, Shavur District, Shush County, Khuzestan Province, Iran. At the 2006 census, its population was 381, in 59 families.

References 

Populated places in Shush County